MTV's Most Wanted is a television series on MTV Europe which was broadcast from 1992 to 1995, based in London, England. It was presented by Ray Cokes. The series was broadcast live from MTV Studios in Camden and featured blends of viewer interaction, competitions, live music performances, and music videos.

Perhaps unusually the crew, including floor managers and camera operators featured heavily in this series, which had one certain ad lib style. Show regulars included “Pathetic Pat” and “Rob the Cameraman” who filmed in typical freehand style by MTV and to whom Cokes talked without his being seen on screen.

Cast 
 Ray Cokes, host
 Will MacDonald, producer

References

MTV original programming
1992 British television series debuts
1995 British television series endings